Kirchheim is a municipality in the district of Ostalbkreis in Baden-Württemberg in Germany.

Twin towns — sister cities
Kirchheim am Ries is twinned with:

  Solarolo, Italy

References

Ostalbkreis
Württemberg